Farm to Market Road 1954 (FM 1954) is a farm to market road in Archer and Clay counties, Texas.

Route description
FM 1954's western terminus is at  FM 368 in the southern outskirts of Holliday in Archer County. The roadway travels to the east and briefly turns to the north to intersect  FM 440 before resuming its primarily eastward trajectory. It intersects  SH 79 south of Lakeside City and Lake Wichita before crossing  US 281 and entering Clay County. The roadway then turns to the south at a junction with  FM 2393 to provide access to Lake Arrowhead State Park via  PR 63. Here the route turns back to the north and reaches its eastern terminus at another junction with FM 2393.

History
FM 1954 was first designated on February 24, 1952. Its western terminus has always been at FM 368 at Holliday, and its original east end was at SH 79. The route was lengthened to US 281 on May 2, 1962. The extension into Clay county and to Lake Arrowhead State Park occurred on January 16, 1968, and the roadway ended within the park. This stub end became part of PR 63 on January 31, 1973. On September 5, 1973, FM 1954 was extended northward to its current terminus at its second intersection with FM 2393.

Major intersections

References

1954
Transportation in Clay County, Texas
Transportation in Archer County, Texas